The Atlantic poacher (Leptagonus decagonus) is a species of poacher native to the northern oceans. This species grows to a length of  TL. This species is the only known member of its genus.

References

Agoninae
Monotypic fish genera
Fish described in 1801